The 1980 United States presidential election in Kentucky took place on November 4, 1980. All 50 states and The District of Columbia were part of the 1980 United States presidential election. Kentucky voters chose 9 electors to the Electoral College, who voted for president and vice president.

Kentucky was won by former California Governor Ronald Reagan (R) by a slim margin of 1 point. , this marks the last time that Scott County, Shelby County, Boyle County, Woodford County, Grant County, Anderson County, Mercer County, Pendleton County, and Washington County voted for a Democratic Presidential candidate, as well as the last time Kentucky voted more Democratic than the nation at large. This was also the most recent election where Kentucky voted to the left of California, Delaware, Illinois, Michigan, Missouri, New Mexico, New York, Oregon, Vermont, and Washington.

Results

Results by county

References

Kentucky
1980
1980 Kentucky elections